Ömer Levent Ülgen (born 8 August 1962) is a Turkish film, television and stage actor.

Career 
Ülgen was educated at Ankara İnönü High School, METU School of Arts and Sciences, and then Hacettepe University Conservatory. He started his theatre career at 's Ankara Public Theatre. He made his debut on stage as an extra in Atçalı Kel Mehmet and continued with different roles in various plays for both children and adult audiences.

After the death of Erkan Yücel, like many artists, he left the Ankara Folk Theatre and joined the Ankara Art Theater under the direction of Rutkay Aziz. While performing in various plays in this venue, he earned the right to study at Hacettepe University Conservatory, Theatre Department. After his graduation, he started to work as an actor and director at the State Theatres. During this period, he completed his master's degree.

He was known for his role as "the wicked groom Kadir" in the television series En Son Babalar Duyar, which was broadcast between 2002 and 2006. He also presented a competition program called Bir Kelime Bir İşlem, which was broadcast on TRT1 for a while.

Ülgen, who is actively involved in the works of NGOs, voluntarily took part in adaptations of Nâzım Hikmet's plays, staged as by Yılmaz Onay at the Nâzım Hikmet Cultural Center. He played the character of "Sinan Kaya" in the TV series Akasya Durağı, which was broadcast on Kanal D and Star TV between 2008 and 2012. He played the character of "Chemist Sıfırcı Ziya" in the TV series Bizim Okul, which was broadcast on ATV in 2013. He rose to prominence agains with the character of "Necmi İplikçi" in the TV series Kiralık Aşk, which was broadcast on Star TV between 2015 and 2017. Most recently, he acted alongside Ata Demirer in the movie Niyazi Gül Dörtnala.

Together with 226 names, including academics, artists, journalists, writers and lawyers, Ülgen is a signatory of the text read during the press release at the establishment of the Union of Socialist Forces, which was founded ahead of the 2023 Turkish general election.

Theatre

As actor 
 The Caucasian Chalk Circle : Bertolt Brecht - Sadri Alışık Theatre - 2013
 Yatak Odası Diyalogları : Birol Güven - Sadri Alışık Theatre - 2013
 İnsanlık Ölmedi Ya : Nâzım Hikmet - Okuma Theatre - 2010
 Yusuf ile Menofis : Nâzım Hikmet - Okuma Theatre - 2009
 İvan İvanoviç Var mıydı? Yok muydu? : Nâzım Hikmet - Okuma Theatre - 2008
 Yalancı Tanık : Nâzım Hikmet - Okuma Theatre - 2007
 Dalga : Reinhold Tritt - Donkişot Tiyatro - 2008
 Gözlerimi Kaparım Vazifemi Yaparım : Haldun Taner - Ankara State Theatre - 2005
 Altona Mahpusları : Jean-Paul Sartre - Ankara State Theatre - 2004
 Aykırı İkili : Neil Simon - Ankara State Theatre - 2003
 Ayrılık : Behiç Ak - Ankara State Theatre
 Crime and Punishment : Fyodor Dostoevsky - Ankara State Theatre - 2001
 Richard III : William Shakespeare - Ankara State Theatre - 2000
 Selim III : Celal Esad Arseven & Salah Cimcoz - Ankara State Theatre - 1999
 Blood Wedding : Federico García Lorca - Ankara State Theatre - 1997
 Murat IV : Turan Oflazoğlu - Ankara State Theatre - 1996
 Asiye Nasıl Kurtulur : Vasıf Öngören - Ankara State Theatre - 1994
 Yılın Kadını : Peter Stone - Ankara State Theatre - 1993
 Salpa : Yılmaz Güney - Ankara State Theatre - 1991
 Kuş : Ülker Köksal - Trabzon State Theatre - 1991
 Kamuoyu : Aurel Baranga - Trabzon State Theatre - 1989
 Yolcu : Nâzım Hikmet - Ankara Art Theatre
 Blood Wedding : Federico García Lorca
 An Enemy of the People : Henrik Ibsen - Ankara Art Theatre - 1985
 Bir Ceza Avukatının Anıları : Faruk Eren  - Ankara Art Theatre - 1984
 Bir Şehnaz Oyun : Turgut Özakman - Ankara Art Theatre - 1984
 Taziye : Murathan Mungan - Ankara Art Theatre - 1983
 Yusuf ile Menofis : Nâzım Hikmet
 A Midsummer Night's Dream : William Shakespeare

As director 
 TV Yıldızı Eva : Sylvia Freedman - Antalya State Theatre
 Can't Pay? Won't Pay! : Dario Fo - Ankara Art Theatre
 Tango : Sławomir Mrożek - Ankara Art Theatre - 2001

Filmography

References

External links 
 
 

1962 births
Living people
Turkish male film actors
Turkish male stage actors
Turkish male television actors
Hacettepe University Ankara State Conservatory alumni